Udea eucrena is a moth of the family Crambidae. It is endemic to the Hawaiian islands of Kauai, Oahu, Maui and Hawaii.

The color pattern varies in intensity and extent. The female has an unusual ovipositor. The lobes are longer than broad.

The larvae feed on Phyllostegia species.

External links

Moths described in 1888
Endemic moths of Hawaii
eucrena